Sandwa is a town in Churu district in the Shekhawati region of Indian state of Rajasthan. Sandwa is situated on Jaipur-Bikaner Highway (SR 20). It is 245 km away from the Jaipur, 125 km from Bikaner and 405 km from Delhi. Near Sandwa town is Chhapar, a small town that is home of the Tal Chhapar Sanctuary. Great wrestler Nathmal Pahalwan was from Sandwa.

It is the site of Sandwa Fort.

References

External links
http://www.jmbcollege.com/
http://www.censusindia.gov.in/PopulationFinder/Sub_Districts_Master.aspx?state_code=08&district_code=04

Villages in Churu district